Jane Osbourn OBE is a scientist and chair of the UK BioIndustry Association.

A Natural Sciences graduate of Queens' College, Cambridge, Jane completed several post-graduate qualifications before moving into industry at Cambridge Antibody Technology, that became MedImmune and AstraZeneca.

In the Queen's Birthday Honours list of 2019, Jane was awarded the Order of the British Empire medal for services to "Human Monoclonal Antibody Drug Research and Development and Biotechnology".

Early life
Osbourn was born in Bingley, West Yorkshire and attended Bingley Grammar School. She is married to John Richer, Professor of Physics at the Cavendish Laboratory, Cambridge.

She is sister to Professor Anne Osbourn FRS who investigates plant natural product biosynthesis.

Academic career
Osbourn went on to study at the Queens' College, Cambridge where she obtained a 1st class degree in Natural Sciences (Biochemistry). She was recognised in 1986 for playing Netball at Queens, and was also awarded both a third year Foundation Scholarship and The Henry Mosseri prize.

She then went on to complete a PhD degree at the John Innes Centre for Plant Science Research in Norwich which resulted in the publication of Evidence that nucleocapsid disassembly and a later step in virus replication are inhibited in transgenic tobacco protoplasts expressing TMV coat protein. Following this she completed a post-doctoral position at Rutgers University, New Jersey, undertaking research directed towards clarification of the sequence elements responsible for the translational enhancement effect conferred by the 5' untranslated region of Tobacco Mosaic Virus known as omega.

Osbourn then moved into medical research through a British Heart Foundation Post-Doctoral Fellowship at the Department of Medicine at Addenbrooke's Hospital in Cambridge.

Career in industry
In 1993 she moved to a small, Cambridge-based start-up biotechnology company called Cambridge Antibody Technology - a company co-founded by Sir Greg Winter and Dr David Chiswell OBE. CAT, as it was called, would pioneer the use of Phage Display technology that ultimately discovered some of the world's highest selling drugs, for example, Humira.

She was the key author of several, high impact scientific papers including Human Antibodies with Sub-nanomolar Affinities Isolated from a Large Non-immunized Phage Display Library, Nature Biotechnology, 1996 and Human Antibodies by Design, Nature Biotechnology, 1998. She is co-author of several others pertaining to antibody discovery and development:
 A Biparatopic HER2-Targeting Antibody-Drug Conjugate Induces Tumor Regression in Primary Models Refractory to or Ineligible for HER2-Targeted Therapy, Cancer Cell, 2019 
 Engineering of a GLP-1 analogue peptide/anti-PCSK9 antibody fusion for type 2 diabetes treatment, Sci Rep, 2018 
 A novel in vivo method for isolating antibodies from a phage display library by neuronal retrograde transport selectively yields antibodies against p75(NTR.), MAbs, 2013 
 Applications of ribosome display to antibody drug discovery, Expert Opin Biol Ther, 2015 
 Signal amplification in flow cytometry using biotin tyramine, Cytometry, 1999 
 Aquaporin-1 is expressed by vascular smooth muscle cells and mediates rapid water transport across vascular cell membranes, J Vasc Res, 1999 
 Directed selection of MIP-1 alpha neutralizing CCR5 antibodies from a phage display human antibody library, Nat Biotechnology, 1999 
 Pathfinder selection: in situ isolation of novel antibodies, Immunotechnology, 1998 
 Generation of a panel of related human scFv antibodies with high affinities for human CEA, Immunotechnology, 1996 

Osbourn is listed as an inventor on several patents, which are (in chronological order):
 EP0865492B1 - Specific binding members for human carcinoembryonic antigen, materials and methods
 EP0906571 - Labelling and selection of molecules
 US5994519A - Labelling and selection of molecules
 EP1353180B1 - Labelling and selection of molecules
 US7074557 - Ribosome Display
 EP1268766 - Improvements to Ribosome Display
 WO2001075097A2 - Improvements to Ribosome Display

She also created a technique to assist with the discovery of proximity-guided selection of antibodies, so called Proximol.

CAT was acquired by AstraZeneca in 2006 and in the following year was merged with a US-based company called MedImmune  to form AstraZeneca’s global biologics R&D arm. During this time Osbourn began to speak about opportunities for diversity in science.

In 2013, AstraZeneca announced its decision to relocate its headquarters to Cambridge, UK. Jonathan Burroughs, of Creative Places, wrote in 2015 that Osbourn had an influence over this decision.

In February 2019, it was announced that Jane would be leaving AstraZeneca.

Since November 2019, Jane has been Chief Scientific Office of antibody therapeutics discovery company Alchemab Therapeutics.

Recognition
Her early interest in science has grown into a passion for science education, supporting and championing life science education programmes and she is established as an advisor and mentor to many young researchers in the life science sector. She has been acknowledged by a number of different pharmaceutical media groups for these qualities.

 She has been recognised in two BioBeat Movers and Shakers lists - BioBeat 50 Movers and Shakers in BioBusiness 2014 and 2016. BioBeat is an organisation that connects entrepreneurs with the leaders in biotech.
 In 2016 she was recognised in the PharmaVoice 100 researchers and scientists. PharmaVOICE is a resource for life-sciences executives and other healthcare-service related professionals 
 In 2016, Fierce Pharma’s “Fierce Women in Biopharma” recognised her as one of 15 women in the global industry noteworthy for their leadership, providing mentorship and helping increase opportunities for women in science. FierceBiotech and its family of publications provide end-to-end coverage of biotech and medtech, from pre-clinical science through clinical testing and regulatory approval.

In 2014 Osbourn was elected to join the board of the BioIndustry Association, becoming Chair in 2016; and in this role she has been working to support the development of the biotechnology sector in the UK. She also does this through her roles as a Director of Babraham Bioscience Technologies and as a Director of Cambridge Enterprise, the technology transfer organisation for University of Cambridge.

Osbourn has presented at a number of parliamentary Select Committees. At the Business, Innovation and Skills Committee, on Tuesday 13 May 2014, she gave evidence on behalf of AstraZeneca as it faced a potential takeover from Pfizer.

On 1 July that year, Osbourn gave evidence to the Science and Technology Select Committee: Priorities for Scientific Research.

Osbourn has also has previously served as a Member of the UK Medical Research Council Industry Grant Award Assessment Panel.

In 2018 the Nobel Prize for Chemistry was awarded jointly to Sir Greg Winter, George Smith and Frances Arnold. Sir Greg Winter received his award for the phage display of peptides and antibodies. Sir Greg and David Chiswell founded Cambridge Antibody Technology to exploit this science. Osbourn says of this time "There was a cohort of really able intellect in Cambridge – in CAT and other companies, in the MRC LMB and in the University – and what happened was a condensation of that focus… Once we decided to make phage display work, we set some really tough goals and then just got on with it." To recognise Jane’s contribution to the prize, she, along with David Chiswell and John McCafferty accompanied Sir Greg to the Nobel ceremony.

On 7 June 2019 she was awarded an OBE for services to Human Monoclonal Antibody Drug Research and Development and Biotechnology. CEO of AstraZeneca, Pascal Soriot, said of the award "On behalf of AstraZeneca, I am delighted to congratulate Dr Jane Osbourn for her award of an OBE in recognition of her services to human monoclonal antibody drug research and development and biotechnology. This well-deserved honour reflects her contribution to biopharmaceutical science over more than 25 years, from Cambridge Antibody Technology to AstraZeneca and MedImmune. Jane’s leadership in UK life sciences includes championing the biotech sector through her position as chair of the BIA and contributing to the growth of the UK’s scientific ecosystem. I would also like to recognise her authentic commitment to building skills through STEM and education outreach, in particular for women in science".

References

Biotechnologists
Members of the Order of the British Empire
Living people
Year of birth missing (living people)
Alumni of Queens' College, Cambridge
Women biotechnologists
21st-century women scientists